Norway competed at the 2004 Summer Paralympics in Athens, Greece. The team included 34 athletes—21 men and 13 women. Norwegian competitors won five medals at the Games, three gold, one silver and one bronze, to finish joint 38th in the medal table.

Medallists

Sports

Athletics

Men's track

Men's field

Women's field

Boccia

Cycling

Men's road

Men's track

Women's road

Women's track

Equestrian

Individual events

Team

Powerlifting

Men

Sailing

Swimming

Men

Women

Table tennis

Men

See also
Norway at the Paralympics
Norway at the 2004 Summer Olympics

References 

Nations at the 2004 Summer Paralympics
2004
Paralympics